Donald Brumson Solomon Jr. (born 2 October 1989) is a Caymanian footballer who plays as a defender. He has represented the Cayman Islands national teamduring the 2010 Caribbean Championship and World Cup qualifying matches in 2008 and 2011.

He was one of a group of Caymanian players identified by the country's football federation who they believed would benefit from playing overseas. He joined Ashford Town (Middlesex) in England after being invited over in late 2010 on an initial short term basis, although the move was extended then until the end of the season. He made one first-team appearance for the club as a substitute.

References

Living people
1989 births
Caymanian footballers
Association football defenders
Cayman Islands international footballers
George Town SC players
Ashford Town (Middlesex) F.C. players
Caymanian expatriate footballers
Caymanian expatriate sportspeople in England
Expatriate footballers in England